The Syracuse University Marching Band (SUMB), also known as the Pride of the Orange, is the collegiate marching band of Syracuse University. The band consists of approximately 200 members. The SUMB performs at all home Syracuse Orange football games throughout the season in the Carrier Dome, and also takes part in parades and other performances throughout the year.  It is one of the largest student organizations at Syracuse University, and one of the oldest collegiate bands in the United States.

References

External links

Atlantic Coast Conference marching bands
Marching Band
Musical groups established in 1901
Marching band
1901 establishments in New York (state)